Sinteza Căușeni is a Moldovan football club based in Căușeni, Moldova. Club was founded in 1992 and played in the second season of Moldovan National Division. Currently they plays in Moldovan "B" Division.

References

External links
 Sinteza Căușeni at WeltFussballArchive 
 Sinteza Căușeni at soccerway

Football clubs in Moldova
Association football clubs established in 1992